As is the case with most anime series, My-HiME has several soundtracks available.

My-HiME Original Soundtrack Vol. 1 - HiME

 It's only the fairy tale sung by Yuuko Miyamura (Alyssa Searrs)

My-HiME Original Soundtrack Vol. 2 - Mai

 Although credited as "Tokiiro no Mai~instrumental ver.~" on the OST, this track is actually Mezame~instrumental ver.~

My-HiME OP Single - Shining☆Days
Singing by Minami Kuribayashi
 Shining☆Days
 Chiisana hoshi ga oriru toki
 Shining☆Days (off vocal)
 Chiisana hoshi ga oriru toki (off vocal)

My-HiME OP Single - Shining☆Days Re-Product & Remix
Singing by Minami Kuribayashi
 Shining☆Days BURST FROOVE MIX
 Shining☆Days verbose:trance MIX
 Shining☆Days LOVE FLARE EASY FILTER MM MIX

My-HiME ED Single - Kimi ga Sora datta
singing by Aki Misato
 Kimi ga sora datta
 TOMORROW'S TRUE
 Kimi ga sora datta (off vocal)
 TOMORROW'S TRUE (off vocal)

My-HiME Fuuka Academy Broadcast Club Single - Parade
singing by Mai Nakahara (Mai), Ai Shimizu (Mikoto) and Saeko Chiba (Natsuki)
 Parade
 Shiritsu Fuuka Gakuen Kouka ~Suishou no Mamori~
 Parade (off vocal)
 Shiritsu Fuuka Gakuen Kouka ~Suishou no Mamori~ (off vocal)

My-HiME Character Song Vol.1 Mai Tokiha (Mai Nakahara) - Itoshisa no Kousaten
 Itoshisa no Kousaten
 Sound Cinema "Natsu no Hajime no Okurimono" (drama)
 Itoshisa no Kousaten (off vocal)

My-HiME Character Song Vol.2 Natsuki Kuga (Saeko Chiba) - Mizube no Hana
 Mizube no Hana
 Sound Cinema "Sentimental Memory"(drama)
 Mizube no Hana (off vocal)

My-HiME Character Song Vol.3 Mikoto Minagi (Ai Shimizu) - Kokoro no Tsurugi
 Kokoro no Tsurugi
 Sound Cinema "Inochi, Yume iro Gensou" (drama)
 Kokoro no Tsurugi (off vocal)

My-HiME Character & Vocal Album - Hatsukoi Houteishiki ~ Dai 1 Gakushou
singing by various cast members
 Mai no Chiisana Omoi - Tokiha Mai (Nakahara Mai)
 Happiness - Tokiha Mai (Nakahara Mai)
 Susume Gakutenou - Sugiura Midori (Tamura Yukari)
 Innocent - Yuuki Nao (Nanri Yuuka)
 Mikoto no Shiawase (^.^) - Minagi Mikoto (Shimizu Ai)
 Pokapoka Pekopeko - Minagi Mikoto (Shimizu Ai)
 Soyokaze no Diary - Higurashi Akane (Iwao Junko)
 Loverocket☆Pilot - Munakata Shiho (Nogawa Sakura)
 Natsuki no Kokoro - Kuga Natsuki (Chiba Saeko)
 Kirei na Yume no Sono Hate Ni - Kuga Natsuki (Chiba Saeko)

 The (^.^) emoticon in Track 5 is actually part of the track title

My-HiME Character & Vocal Album - Hatsukoi Houteishiki ~ Dai 2 Gakushou
singing by various cast members
 Itoshisa no Kousaten ~Mai no Yuujou Nikki Sono 1 - Tokiha Mai (Nakahara Mai)
 Bokutachi no Yuuki - Kikukawa Yukino (Noto Mamiko) and Suzushiro Haruka (Yuzuki Ryoka)
 Angel's Dew - Miyu Greer (Asai Kiyomi)
 Houkago Hide and Seek - Harada Chie (Saiga Mitsuki) and Senou Aoi (Shintani Ryoko)
 Kurenai no Ninpuu Rekkaden - Okuzaki Akira (Kobayashi Sanae)
 Ashita no Arata - Sanada Yukariko (Inoue Kikuko)
 Katakoi Enka - Fujino Shizuru (Shindou Naomi)
 Rasen Teien - Kazahana Mashiro and Himeno Fumi (Yukana)
 Itoshisa no Kousaten ~Mai no Yuujou Nikki 2 Mirai he no Message - Tokiha Mai (Nakahara Mai)

My-HiME Original Music Clip - Character Song Collection Music Videos
singing by Mai Nakahara (Mai), Ai Shimizu (Mikoto), Saeko Chiba (Natsuki), Kuribayashi Minami
 Itoshisa no Kousaten
 Mizube no Hana
 Kokoro no Tsurugi
 Shining☆Days

My-HiME Unmei no Keitouju OP Single - Asura Hime
From the PlayStation 2 videogame. Opening Single by Ali Project
 Asura Hime
 Kimi ga tame, Oshikarazarishi Inochi sae
 Asura Hime (off vocal)
 Kimi ga tame, Oshikarazarishi Inochi sae (off vocal)

My-HiME Unmei no Keitouju ED Single - Silent Wing
Singing by Aki Misato
 Silent wing
 Goal to NEW WORLD
 Silent wing (off vocal)
 Goal to NEW WORLD (off vocal)

My-HiME Unmei no Keitouju Original Soundtrack - Last Moment
Complete soundtrack from the PlayStation 2 videogame 
composition by Yōsei Teikoku

 last moment
 Fortuna
 Inishie no Kotodama
 Kouji Busshitsuka Ether Rinkai
 Hitoku
 Yochou
 Igyou
 Jashin no Saidan
 Himegoroshi ~Honrou~
 Tamashii no Kikan
 Himegoroshi ~Unmei~
 Kourin
 Daitenshi no Ibuki
 Shuugeki no Ato de

My-HiME Best Collection
Various tracks mostly from previously released sources
 Ensei - Kajiura Yuki
 Shining☆Days - Kuribayashi Minami
 TOMORROW'S TRUE - Misato Aki
 Itoshisa no Kousaten - Tokiha Mai (Mai Nakahara)
 Mizube no Hana - Kuga Natsuki (Chiba Saeko)
 Kokoro no Tsurugi - Mikoto Minagi (Ai Shimizu)
 It's only the fairy tale - Alyssa Sears (Miyamura Yuuko)
 Chiisana Hoshi ga Oriru Toki - Kuribayashi Minami
 Parade - Tokiha Mai, Kuga Natsuki, Minagi Mikoto (Mai Nakahara, Chiba Saeko, Ai Shimizu)
 Last Moment - Yousei Teikoku
 Fortuna - Yousei Teikoku
 Ashura Hime - Ali Project
 Silent Wing - Misato Aki
 Kimi ga Sora Datta - Misato Aki
 Shiritsu Fuuka Gakuen Kouka - Tokiha Mai, Kuga Natsuki, Minagi Mikoto (Mai Nakahara, Chiba Saeko, Ai Shimizu)
 My-HiME Promotion BGM - Kajiura Yuki

Anime soundtracks

2004 soundtrack albums
2005 soundtrack albums